Paul Cohen (November 10, 1908 – April 1, 1970) was an American country music producer.

Career

Cohen was chiefly responsible for Nashville's emergence as the country music recording capital and the Nashville Sound and was a long-time Decca Records executive. As President of the Country Music Association (CMA), Cohen was on hand when the Country Music Hall of Fame opened in 1967.

Cohen first entered the record business with Columbia in the late 1920s, but in 1934 joined Decca's newly formed American operation, organized by two brothers, Jack and Dave Kapp—old Chicago friends of his. Cohen moved to Cincinnati to become Decca's midwestern branch manager in 1935; in this role he was responsible for scouting, producing and signing new talent in addition to marketing records. During World War II, he gradually took over Decca's hillbilly production work from Dave Kapp, and in the mid-1940s moved to New York to head that branch of the company.

With two of Decca's main country stars based on Nashville's Grand Ole Opry—Ernest Tubb and Red Foley. In August 1947, Cohen began regular recording of his country roster in Castle Recording's new studios, located in the Tulane Hotel at Eighth Avenue North and Church Street in Nashville. Musicians Beasley Smith and Owen Bradley helped Cohen schedule his intensive, two-to-three-week Nashville visits by lining up stars, musicians, and arrangements (many of them created on the spot). Cohen is remembered for an energetic production style—as much cheerleader as executive—and a knack for spotting new artists and matching them with songs (often published by his own publishing companies). Kitty Wells, Webb Pierce, Brenda Lee, Patsy Cline, and Bobby Helms were among the new acts signed and produce by Cohen during his tenure, while Tubb, Foley, Jimmie Davis, and others continued to have success with the label.

Cohen left Decca's country department early in 1958 (replaced by Owen Bradley some weeks later), first to do pop production for Decca's Coral subsidiary. Soon Cohen launched his own company, Todd Records, and besides signing such country acts as Pee Wee King and Dub Dickerson, the label enjoyed a pop hit, Joe Henderson's "Snap Your Fingers." In 1964 Cohen rejoined his old boss Dave Kapp as head of Kapp Records' country division in Nashville. In four years at Kapp, Cohen signed and produced Hugh X. Lewis, Cal Smith, Billy Edd Wheeler, and Mel Tillis, among others. Cohen's last major executive position was as head of ABC Records Nashville office (1968–1969), which he left after being diagnosed with cancer.

He died in Bryan, Texas, on April 1, 1970, and was buried in nearby College Station, Texas. In an unprecedented gesture, Nashville's Music Row offices closed for a memorial service a week later (April 7), but the lasting testimony to his memory and importance came with his posthumous election to the Country Music Hall of Fame in 1976.

Adapted from the Country Music Hall of Fame® and Museum's Encyclopedia of Country Music, published by Oxford University Press.

1908 births
1970 deaths
People from Chicago
Record producers from Illinois
Country Music Hall of Fame inductees
20th-century American businesspeople